Bradley's Robot is an EP by Richard D. James under the alias Bradley Strider (referred to as Strider. B. on the label).

The EP was pressed in 12" vinyl format and does not come in a picture sleeve, but rather is housed within a (folded) 92.4 x 121.9 cm glossy green print on silver RePhLeX poster.

The following message is etched in the record's run-out groove, on Side A: "PYJAMAS".

On 9 May 2015, a version of the second track on side A was posted on Richard's Soundcloud under the name "27 leaving home - bradley."

Track listing

Side one
 NgaiModu – 5:54
 Leaving Home – 7:40

Side two
 Linmiri – 5:53
 (untitled) – 5:50

References

discogs.com entry

Aphex Twin EPs
1993 EPs
Rephlex Records EPs